MV Eilean Na H-Oige is a small passenger ferry built for the Outer Hebrides and now operating in Southern Ireland.

History
MV Eilean Na H-Oige was built for the Western Isles Council in 1980 for the service to Eriskay. Her name is taken from a poem about Eriskay by Fr. Allan MacDonald. After a causeway opened in 2001, she was laid up, until acquired by Bere Island Ferries in 2003.

Layout
Eilean Na H-Oige is a small bow-loading landing craft type ferry.

Service
Eilean Na H-Oige was built for the service from Eriskay to Ludaig on South Uist in the Outer Hebrides. In July 2001, a causeway opened, making her redundant. From March 2002, she started a new service across the Sound of Barra, from a new terminal at Ceann a' Ghàraidh to Ardmor on Barra. The service was taken over by CalMac vessels ( then ) and she was laid up.

Since August 2003, she has operated from Castletownbere to Bere Island in Southern Ireland, alongside another former Comhairle nan Eilean Siar ferry, .

References

External links
 Images

Ferries of Scotland
Ferries of the Republic of Ireland
1980 ships
Ships built in Scotland